Akvavit Theatre is a theater company in Chicago with a focus on Nordic and Scandinavian works. Beginning performances on 8 October 2010, it was born out of the "Nordic Spaces" project funded by the Bank of Sweden Tercentenary Foundation, which began in 2008.

History
A group of five staged readings from several Scandinavian countries formed the initial production. The first reading was God Times Five, a play by Swedish playwright Jonas Hassen Khemiri, directed by Chad Eric Bergman. The four other plays in the sequence were Red and Green, by Dane Astrid Saalbach, directed by Jessica Hutchinson; Kokkola by Finn Leea Klemola, directed by Kevin Heckman; Verkeleg, a reality play by Norwegian Gyrid Axe Øvsteng, directed by Robin Witt; and Óhapp by Icelandic playwright Bjarni Jónsson, directed by Jonathan Berry.

In 2015 the company staged the U.S. premiere of Andri Snær Magnason's Blue Planet, based on his book, The Story of the Blue Planet, a "family-friendly" story directed by Wm. Bullion. Also in 2015, the company took part in the annual holiday message from the Chicago theater community.

Akvavit's 2017 production of Hitler on the Roof by Rhea Leman co-directed by co-artistic director Kirstin Franklin and Associate company member Amber Robinson was selected as one of the productions to be produced in the 2018 grand re-opening season of Theatre on the Lake presented by the Chicago Park District.

List of productions 
2011
 Red and Green, by Astrid Saalbach and directed by Chad Eric Bergman
2012
 Kokkola, by Leea Klemola and directed by Chad Eric Bergman
2013
Gjenganger: 3 Plays by Jon Fosse
A Summer's Day, directed by Wm Bullion
Autumn Dream, directed by Breahan Pautsch 
Winter, directed by Paul Holmquist
They Died Where they Lied, by Sofia Freden and co-directed by Mark Litwicki and Matthew Isler
2014
Mishap, by Bjarni Jönssan and directed by Chad Eric Bergman
The Frozen on the Square, by Lucas Svensson and directed by Breahan Pautsch
2015
Blue Planet, by Andri Snær Magnason and directed by Wm Bullion, movement direction by Nicole Jordan 
The Orchestra, by Okko Leo and directed by Brad Akin
2016
Nothing of Me, by Arne Lygre and co-directed by Chad Eric Bergman and Breahan Pautsch
Hand in Hand, by Sofia Freden and directed by Breahan Pautsch
2017
Hitler on the Roof, by Rhea Leman and co-directed by Kirstin Franklin and Amber Robinson
Ghosts and Zombies, by Henrik Ibsen and Gustav Tegby and directed by Breahan Pautsch
2018
Bad Girls: The Stylists, by Astrid Saalbach and directed by Breahan Pautsch 
Rising Temperatures
Bleeding Heart, by Rhea Leman and directed by Breahan Pautsch
Solar Storm, by Jens Kløft and directed by Linsey Falls
Its Getting Warmer, by Joan Rang Christensen and directed by Lee Peters
Escape, by Kristian Halken and directed by Lindsay Tornquist

References

Arts organizations established in 2010
Danish-American culture
Finnish-American culture
Icelandic-American culture
Norwegian-American culture in Chicago
Regional theatre in the United States
Swedish-American culture in Chicago
Theatre companies in Chicago
Theatre company production histories
2010 establishments in Illinois